The 2011–12 Tribute Cornwall League 2, was a full season of rugby union within Cornwall League 2. Due to restructuring, this was the first time the level ten league, which is within the English rugby union league system, ran since the 2008–09 season.

Team Changes
Camelford RFC were accepted into the league system for the first time, the other six teams were previously in Tribute Cornwall League One.

Table

See also

 English rugby union system

References

External links
  Trelawny's Army

Cornwall
Cornwall League 2